Swim is the fifth studio album by Canadian musician Dan Snaith, released under the moniker Caribou on April 20, 2010 by City Slang and Merge. It is his third album credited under Caribou and deviated from the psychedelic pop of his recent work and toward dance music.

Swim continued the critical success set by Snaith and was critically acclaimed upon its release, later making several publications' year-end best album lists. It was recognized as one of "The 100 Best Albums of the Decade So Far" by Pitchfork in August 2014.

Swim Remixes, a compilation of remixes from the album, was released in 2010 by Merge Records and features remixes by artists such as Junior Boys, Fuck Buttons, and Nite Jewel.

Background
Swim was, according to Snaith, "pretty much me getting up every day and wanting to work on music. Working constantly on it. Making loads and loads and loads of music and then just sifting through to find the bits that I like". Playing more DJ gigs, such as those at London's Plastic People, influenced the musician to embrace dance music and a greater range of frequencies in his music, which led to the formulation of Swim. Nevertheless, about 700 songs, some unfinished, did not make it onto the album.

"Jamelia" features vocals by Luke Lalonde of Born Ruffians.

Reception

Swim received acclaim from critics, being assigned a Metascore of 83 by Metacritic. It was a shortlisted nominee for the 2010 Polaris Music Prize, and was named the Best Album of 2010 by Resident Advisor. The album also won the Juno Award in 2010 for Best Electronic Album of the Year and was awarded the second spot in Exclaim!'''s 2010 Electronic Year in Review. Daniel Sylvester of Exclaim! praised the organic nature of the album, claiming "Caribou will be remembered for Swim."

As of 2011, it has sold 33,803 copies in US. As of 2015 it has sold 175,000 copies worldwide according to Independent Music Companies Association.

Publications ranking Swim on their end-of-year lists included:
1st Resident Advisor
1st Urban75
1st Mixmag
4th musicOMH
6th The Guardian
17th Pitchfork
19th Drowned In Sound
39th Spin
58th NME

The first track on the album, "Odessa", was featured in a commercial for the automobile manufacturer Acura, the football video game by EA Sports, FIFA 11'', as well as in a 2011 Lexus CT 200h commercial, and a 2012 Tissot commercial for watches.

Track listing

Charts

References

External links
 Swim at official Caribou website
 

2010 albums
Dan Snaith albums
City Slang albums
Merge Records albums
Juno Award for Electronic Album of the Year albums